Nazareno Cruz and the Wolf (original title translatable as "Nazareno Cruz and the Wolf: The Doves and the Screams") is a 1975 Argentine fantasy drama film coproduced and directed by Leonardo Favio and starring Juan José Camero, Marina Magali and Alfredo Alcón. It was written by Favio and Jorge Zuhair Jury, Favio's brother and frequent script collaborator. The story works as an adaptation of the classical myth of the Lobizón, and it has become a classic film. It is also widely known as the most successful of all time in its country. With 3.4 million viewers it holds the national record ahead of El secreto de sus ojos.

It was selected as the Argentine entry for the Best Foreign Language Film at the 48th Academy Awards, but was not accepted as a nominee. It was also entered in the 9th Moscow International Film Festival.

In a survey of the 100 greatest films of Argentine cinema carried out by the Museo del Cine Pablo Ducrós Hicken in 2000, the film reached the 30th position. In a new version of the survey organized in 2022 by the specialized magazines La vida útil, Taipei and La tierra quema, presented at the Mar del Plata International Film Festival, the film reached the 17th position. Also in 2022, the film was included in Spanish magazine Fotogramass list of the 20 best Argentine films of all time.

Synopsis 
Nazareno Cruz is a young farmer living in a rural town. He is known for being the seventh son of his father, and so he is seen by the locals as the victim of the werewolf curse. Despite this he lives happily in the community. When Nazareno is about to turn 18 he meets Griselda and they both fall in love. Soon after, "Mandinga" (the Devil) presents himself to Nazareno and explains that his curse is real. Mandinga makes Nazareno a proposition: if Nazareno gives up his love, he will receive in exchange his freedom and many riches. Nazareno refuses the deal and eventually turns into a werewolf, becoming involved in a series of tragedies.

Cast 
 Juan José Camero ... Nazareno Cruz
 Marina Magali ... Griselda
 Alfredo Alcón ... The Powerful/Mandinga
 Lautaro Murúa ... Julián
 Nora Cullen ... The Lechiguana
 Elcira Olivera Garcés ... Damiana
 Saul Jarlip ... The Old Man Pancho
 Juanita Lara ... Fidelia
 Yolanda Mayorani ... The Powerful's Godmother
 Marcelo Marcote ... The Child
 Josefina Faustín
 Augusto Kretschmar

See also 
 List of submissions to the 48th Academy Awards for Best Foreign Language Film
 List of Argentine submissions for the Academy Award for Best Foreign Language Film

References

External links 
 
 
 Nazareno Cruz y el Lobo at Cinenacional.com 

1975 films
1970s Spanish-language films
1970s fantasy films
Films directed by Leonardo Favio
Argentine fantasy films
Argentine films based on plays
Films based on multiple works
Films based on Goethe's Faust
The Devil in film
Films based on radio series